North Woodbridge was a former census-designated place (CDP) in San Joaquin County, California, United States. The population was 1,320 at the 2000 census. For the 2010 census, the CDP's of South Woodbridge and North Woodbridge were merged into Woodbridge.

Geography
North Woodbridge is located at  (38.160369, -121.308981).

Demographics
As of the census of 2000, there were 1,320 people, 492 households, and 417 families residing in the CDP. The racial makeup of the CDP was 92.05% White, 0.08% African American, 0.76% Native American, 3.11% Asian, 0.08% Pacific Islander, 0.53% from other races, and 3.41% from two or more races. Hispanic or Latino of any race were 6.74% of the population.

There were 492 households, out of which 35.8% had children under the age of 18 living with them, 78.9% were married couples living together, 3.5% had a female householder with no husband present, and 15.2% were non-families. 11.6% of all households were made up of individuals, and 4.3% had someone living alone who was 65 years of age or older. The average household size was 2.68 and the average family size was 2.93.

In the CDP, the population was spread out, with 25.0% under the age of 18, 4.7% from 18 to 24, 22.6% from 25 to 44, 33.6% from 45 to 64, and 14.1% who were 65 years of age or older. The median age was 44 years. For every 100 females, there were 91.3 males. For every 100 females age 18 and over, there were 91.9 males.

The median income for a household in the CDP was $79,417, and the median income for a family was $87,285. Males had a median income of $62,250 versus $50,500 for females. The per capita income for the CDP was $45,693. About 2.8% of families and 3.8% of the population were below the poverty line, including 3.2% of those under age 18 and none of those age 65 or over.

References

Former census-designated places in California
Populated places in San Joaquin County, California